Norldon Leroy Williams (July 10, 1927 – July 23, 1994), nicknamed "Jeff", was an American Negro league infielder in the 1940s.

A native of Orlando, Florida, Williams attended Jones High School in Orlando. He made his Negro leagues debut in 1947 for the Newark Eagles, and played for Newark again in 1948. Williams went on to play in the minor leagues for the Syracuse Chiefs and Tulsa Oilers, and finished his career with the Orlando Flyers in 1958. He died in Orlando in 1994 at age 67.

References

External links
 and Seamheads

1927 births
1994 deaths
Newark Eagles players
20th-century African-American sportspeople
Baseball infielders